Meenakshi Vilasam Government Vocational Higher Secondary School (MVGVHSS) is a school located in Punthalathazham, India. When it was first established in 1944, the school was situated near Sree Meenakshi Temple and named Kalluvilla Private School. Kunjan Pillai was the manager and headmaster.

The school was later relocated to near Peroor Meenakshi Temple. Since then, it has been known as Meenakshi Vilasam School. In 1947, the school came under the control of the Kerala government, and 19 years later it was promoted to a high school. In 1974, the school was divided into primary and high school. Starting in 1993, MVGVHSS offered vocational education, and in 2000, non-vocational higher secondary education was introduced.

Departments 

The school serves students from the fifth standard to higher secondary and vocational higher secondary levels.

Facilities 
MVGVHSS covers two acres. The high school has 41 classrooms contained within five buildings, vocational higher secondary includes five classrooms between two buildings, and the higher secondary school includes six classrooms within two buildings. Facilities include a playground and three computer labs with broadband connection.

Extracurricular activities 

Apart from the formal classes, students take part in co-curricular activities like Scouts and Guides, NCC, SPC magazine publishing, Vidyarangam art and literature club, Eco Club, Health Club, English Club, Math Club, IT Club, Science Club, and S S Club.

References

External links

 Department of School Education in Kerala

Schools in Kollam district
High schools and secondary schools in Kerala